Nilay Kartaltepe (born 13 January 1979 in Bakırköy, Istanbul) is a Turkish professional basketball player of Ormanspor.

International career
She was the member of the national team, which won the gold medal at the 2005 Mediterranean Games in Almería, Spain and the silver medal at EuroBasket 2011 in Poland.

Honors
Turkish Women's Basketball League
Winners (4): 2002, 2004, 2006, 2007
Runners-up (1): 2010
Turkish Cup
Winners (5): 2004, 2005, 2006, 2007, 2010
Turkish Presidential Cup
Winners (3): 2004, 2005, 2007

Personal life
Nilay Kartaltepe is married to Fenerbahçe Istanbul volleyball player Cengizhan Kartaltepe in 2010.

External links
Profile at tbf.org.tr
Player Profile at Eurobasket Women 2009

References

1979 births
Living people
Basketball players at the 2012 Summer Olympics
Beşiktaş women's basketball players
Botaş SK players
Fenerbahçe women's basketball players
Galatasaray S.K. (women's basketball) players
Olympic basketball players of Turkey
Panküp TED Kayseri Koleji basketball players
Point guards
Basketball players from Istanbul
Turkish women's basketball players